José Rodríguez Martínez (born 16 December 1994) is a Spanish professional footballer who plays as a central midfielder.

He began his career at Real Madrid, where he played mostly in the reserves, and was loaned to Deportivo before being sold to Galatasaray. He subsequently represented Mainz 05 (where he had loan spells with Málaga, Maccabi Tel Aviv and Fortuna Sittard), and Málaga (also being loaned to Fuenlabrada). He joined Maccabi Haifa in 2020.

Rodríguez represented Spain up to under-21 level.

Club career

Real Madrid
Born in Villajoyosa, Alicante, Valencian Community of Romani descent, Rodríguez played for three clubs as a youth, finishing his youth career with Real Madrid who he joined at the age of 14. He made his senior debut three years later, with Real Madrid Castilla in the Segunda División.

On 30 October 2012, Rodríguez was called up to the first team for the first time, as manager José Mourinho picked him for a match against CD Alcoyano in that season's Copa del Rey; he came on as a substitute at half-time, and scored the third goal in a 4–1 away win.

Rodríguez made his La Liga debut on 1 December 2012, playing the last minute of a 2–0 victory over Atlético Madrid. Three days later, he became the youngest player ever to appear for Real Madrid in the UEFA Champions League match at 17 years and 354 days, when he replaced Kaká in the 4–1 group stage defeat of AFC Ajax.

In 2013–14, Rodríguez made 37 appearances and scored four times as Castilla were relegated to Segunda División B. He was booked 14 times during the campaign, being sent off on 15 February 2014 in a 3–1 win over FC Barcelona B at the Alfredo di Stéfano Stadium.

On 22 July 2014, Rodríguez joined Deportivo de La Coruña in a season-long loan deal. He played 27 competitive games, with his side narrowly avoiding relegation; his first top-flight goals came in 2–2 draws against Rayo Vallecano and Granada CF, both at home.

Galatasaray
Rodríguez signed for Galatasaray SK in the summer of 2015, after agreeing to a four-year contract. Unused in the Süper Lig opener at Sivasspor on 15 August, he made his debut nine days later by starting in a 1–2 loss to Osmanlıspor at the Türk Telekom Arena.

Mainz
On 29 June 2016, Rodríguez moved to 1. FSV Mainz 05 on a four-year deal. He was sent off a mere five minutes into his German Bundesliga debut, after a dangerous challenge on FC Augsburg's Dominik Kohr in an eventual 1–3 home defeat.

On the very last day of the 2017 January transfer window, Rodríguez was loaned to Málaga CF until June. He was again ejected in his second appearance, being booked twice in an eventual 2–1 home win against UD Las Palmas.

Rodríguez left on loan for a third time in August 2018, joining Eredivisie club Fortuna Sittard.

Málaga return
On 18 August 2019, Rodríguez returned to Málaga after agreeing to a three-year contract. However, due to the club's financial problems, he was not registered for the first half of the campaign, and was subsequently loaned to fellow second-tier CF Fuenlabrada the following 30 January.

Maccabi Haifa
Rodríguez returned to the Israeli Premier League on 10 September 2020, after he signed with Maccabi Haifa F.C. on a yearly salary of €270,000. On 1 March 2021, his cousin died in Spain aged 29 from COVID-19 complications, and it was decided that the team's players would wear black armbands in the next match in her memory. He scored the winning goal two days later, a powerful long-range volley in a 2–1 victory over Hapoel Tel Aviv FC, which earned him praise from Israeli pundits as well as Spanish media.

Union Saint-Gilloise
Rodriguez joined Belgian Pro League side Royale Union Saint-Gilloise in summer 2022. On 15 February 2023, he terminated his two-year contract by mutual consent.

International career
Rodríguez captained Spain at the 2013 UEFA European Under-19 Championship in Lithuania. In the semi-final against France, he scored a penalty kick to open a 2–1 defeat after extra time.

Career statistics

Honours
Galatasaray
Turkish Cup: 2015–16

Maccabi Tel Aviv
Toto Cup: 2017–18

Maccabi Haifa
Israeli Premier League: 2020–21, 2021–22
Toto Cup: 2021–22
Israel Super Cup: 2021

References

External links

1994 births
Living people
People from Villajoyosa
Spanish Romani people
Sportspeople from the Province of Alicante
Spanish footballers
Footballers from the Valencian Community
Association football midfielders
La Liga players
Segunda División players
Real Madrid Castilla footballers
Real Madrid CF players
Deportivo de La Coruña players
Málaga CF players
CF Fuenlabrada footballers
Süper Lig players
Galatasaray S.K. footballers
Bundesliga players
1. FSV Mainz 05 players
Israeli Premier League players
Maccabi Tel Aviv F.C. players
Maccabi Haifa F.C. players
Eredivisie players
Fortuna Sittard players
Belgian Pro League players
Royale Union Saint-Gilloise players
Spain youth international footballers
Spain under-21 international footballers
Spanish expatriate footballers
Expatriate footballers in Germany
Expatriate footballers in Turkey
Expatriate footballers in Israel
Expatriate footballers in the Netherlands
Expatriate footballers in Belgium
Spanish expatriate sportspeople in Germany
Spanish expatriate sportspeople in Turkey
Spanish expatriate sportspeople in Israel
Spanish expatriate sportspeople in the Netherlands
Spanish expatriate sportspeople in Belgium